The First Secretary of the Kabardino–Balkarian regional branch of the Communist Party of the Soviet Union was the position of highest authority in the Kabardino-Balkarian AO (1921–1936), Kabardino-Balkarian ASSR (1936–1944, 1957–1991) and the Kabardin ASSR (1944–1957) in the Russian SFSR of the Soviet Union. The position was created in 1921, and abolished in August 1991. The First Secretary was a de facto appointed position usually by the Politburo or the General Secretary himself.

List of First Secretaries of the Kabardino–Balkar Communist Party

Notes

See also
Kabardino-Balkarian Autonomous Oblast
Kabardino-Balkarian Autonomous Soviet Socialist Republic

Sources
 World Statesmen.org

1921 establishments in Russia
1991 disestablishments in the Soviet Union
Kabardino–Balkar
Politics of Kabardino-Balkaria